The 2023 IIHF World U18 Championship will be the 24th such event hosted by the International Ice Hockey Federation. Teams will participate at several levels of competition. The competition will also serve as qualifications for the 2024 competition.

Top Division
The tournament will be held from April 20 to April 30 2023 in Basel and Porrentruy, Switzerland.

Preliminary round

Group A
The Group A tournament will be held in Porrentruy, Switzerland from 20 to 25 April 2023.

Group B
The Group B tournament will be held in Basel, Switzerland from 20 to 25 April 2023.

Relegation round

Playoff round
Winning teams will be reseeded in accordance with the following ranking:

higher position in the group
higher number of points
better goal difference
higher number of goals scored for
better seeding coming into the tournament (final placement at the 2022 IIHF World U18 Championships).

Bracket

Quarterfinals

Semifinals

Bronze medal game

Gold medal game

Division I

Group A
The tournament will be played in Angers, France, from 23 to 29 April 2023.

Group B
The tournament will be played in Bled, Slovenia, from 10 to 16 April 2023.

Division II

Group A
The tournament will be played in Belgrade, Serbia, from 9 to 15 April 2023.

Group B
The tournament will be played in Sofia, Bulgaria, from 27 March to 2 April 2023.

Division III

Group A
The tournament is being played in Akureyri, Iceland, from 12 to 18 March 2023.

Group B
The tournament was played in Cape Town, South Africa, from 13 to 16 March 2023.

References 

2023 IIHF World U18 Championships
2023 in ice hockey
2022–23 in Swiss ice hockey
IIHF World U18 Championships
International ice hockey competitions hosted by Switzerland
IIHF World U18 Championships
Sport in Basel
IIHF